Fred Milano (August 26, 1939 – January 1, 2012) was an American doo-wop singer of Italian descent. Born in the Bronx, New York, he was a member (second tenor) of The Belmonts who became successful in the late 1950s as Dion and the Belmonts, and in the early 1960s. The Belmonts got their name from the street that Milano lived on, Belmont Avenue.

Life

He had participated in every one of the Belmonts' recording sessions dating back 54 years. Dion DiMucci said of his death; "I was shocked, obviously, because it was so sudden. It was already in stage four when he found out there was anything wrong with him. It hit hard because a relationship like we had, it’s ingrained in you. We knew each other from our teenage boyhoods; even though we weren’t close and didn’t talk in later years, what we went through together made us like family. He and the Belmonts — they were the very best. Freddie was almost like a genius with vocal harmony. I was humbled to sing with Freddie, Carlo and Angelo."

In 2000, Dion and the Belmonts were inducted in the Vocal Group Hall of Fame.

Milano died on January 1, 2012, from lung cancer in New York, at the age of 72.

Discography

Singles
 Mohawk Records 
 "Santa Margherita" / "Teen-Age Clementine" (1957) - The Belmonts
 "Tag Along" / "We Went Away" (1958) - Dion and the Belmonts
 Laurie Records 
 "I Wonder Why" / "Teen Angel" (1958) - Dion and the Belmonts
 "No One Knows" / "I Can't Go On (Rosalie)" (1958) - Dion and the Belmonts
 "Don't Pity Me" / "Just You" (1958) - Dion and the Belmonts
 "A Teenager in Love" / "Ive Cried Before" (1959) - Dion and the Belmonts
 "A Lover's Prayer" / "Every Little Thing I Do" (1959) - Dion and the Belmonts
 "Where or When" / "That's My Desire" (1960) - Dion and the Belmonts
 "When You Wish upon a Star" / "Wonderful Girl" (1960) - Dion and the Belmonts
 "In the Still of the Night" / "A Funny Feeling" (1960) - Dion and the Belmonts
 "We Belong Together" / "Such A Long Way" (1961) - The Belmonts
 "Story Teller" / "A Brand New Song" (1975) - The Belmonts
 Sabrina/Sabina Records 
 "Tell Me Why" / "Smoke From Your Cigarette" (1961) - The Belmonts
 "Don't Get Around Much Anymore" / Searching For A New Love" (1961) - The Belmonts
 "I Need Someone" / "That American Dance" (1961) - The Belmonts
 "I Confess" / "Hombre" (1962) - The Belmonts
 "Come On Little Angel" / "How About Me" (1962) - The Belmonts
 "Diddle-Dee-Dum" / "Farewell" (1962) - The Belmonts
 "Ann-Marie" / "Ac-Cent-Tuate-The-Positive" (1962) - The Belmonts
 "Let's Call It A Day" / "Walk On Boy" (1963) - The Belmonts
 "More Important Things To Do" / "Walk On Boy" (1963) - The Belmonts
 "C'mon Everybody" / "Why" (1963) - The Belmonts
 "Nothing In Return" / "Summertime" (1964) - The Belmonts
 United Artists Records 
 "I Don't Know Why, I Just Do" / "Wintertime" (1965) - The Belmonts
 "Today My Love Has Gone Away" / "(Then) I Walked Away" (1965) - The Belmonts
 "To Be With You" / "I Got A Feeling" (1965) - The Belmonts
 "You're Like A Mystery" / "Come With Me" (1966) - The Belmonts
 ABC Records 
 "My Girl The Month of May" / "Berimbau" (1966) - Dion and the Belmonts
 "Movin' Man" / "For Bobbie" (1967) - Dion and the Belmonts
 Dot Records 
 "She Only Wants To Do Her Own Thing" / "Reminiscing" (1968) - The Belmonts
 "Have You Heard-The Worst That Could Happen" / "Answer Me My Love" (1969) - The Belmonts
 Strawberry Records 
 "I'll Never Fall In Love Again" / "Voyager" (1976) - The Belmonts
 Miasound Records 
 "Let’s Put The Fun Back In Rock n Roll" / "Your Mama Ain’t Always Right" (1981) - The Belmonts with Freddy Cannon

Albums
 Presenting Dion and the Belmonts (1959)
 Wish Upon A Star with Dion and the Belmonts (1960)
 Together Again (1967) - Dion and the Belmonts
 Summer Love (1969) - The Belmonts
 Cigars, Acappella, Candy (1972) - The Belmonts
 Reunion (1973) - Dion and the Belmonts

References

External links
 The Belmonts official website

1939 births
2012 deaths
American people of Italian descent
American male pop singers
People from the Bronx
Deaths from lung cancer in New York (state)
Dion and the Belmonts members
Belmont, Bronx
Singers from New York City